Randolph College is a private liberal arts and sciences college in Lynchburg, Virginia. Founded in 1891 as Randolph-Macon Woman's College, it was renamed on July 1, 2007, when it became coeducational.

The college offers 32 majors; 42 minors; ‘pre-professional’ programs in law, medicine, veterinary medicine, engineering physics, and teaching; and a dual degree program in engineering. Undergraduate degrees offered include the Bachelor of Arts, Bachelor of Science, and Bachelor of Fine Arts. Randolph also offers three graduate degrees, the Master of Arts in Teaching, Master of Fine Arts in Creative Writing, and the Master of Arts in Coaching and Sport Leadership.

Randolph College is an NCAA Division III school competing in the Old Dominion Athletic Conference (ODAC). The college fields varsity teams in six men's and eight women's sports. 

Notable alumnae include author Pearl S. Buck, who won the Nobel Prize and Pulitzer Prize, food and travel author Frances Mayes, former U.S. Senator Blanche Lincoln, and CNN senior political correspondent Candy Crowley.

Randolph is a member of The Annapolis Group of colleges in the United States, the Council of Independent Colleges in Virginia, and the Virginia Foundation for Independent Colleges.

History
The college was founded by William Waugh Smith, then-president of Randolph-Macon College, under Randolph-Macon's charter after he failed to convince R-MC to become co-educational. Randolph-Macon Woman's College has historic ties to the United Methodist Church. After many attempts to find a location for Randolph-Macon Woman's College, the city of Lynchburg donated 50 acres for the purpose of establishing a women's college. In 1916, it became the first women's college in the South to earn a Phi Beta Kappa charter. Beginning in 1953, the two colleges were governed by separate boards of trustees.

Main Hall, built in 1891, was listed on the National Register of Historic Places in 1979.

In August 2006, only a few weeks into the academic year, Randolph-Macon Woman's College announced that it would adopt coeducation and change its name. Former Interim president Ginger H. Worden argued in a September 17, 2006 editorial for The Washington Post that,

today, the college is embarking on a new future, one that will include men. Yet that original mission, that dedication to women's values and education, remains. The fact of the marketplace is that only 3 percent of college-age women say they will consider a women's college. The majority of our own students say they weren't looking for a single-sex college specifically. Most come despite the fact that we are a single-sex college. Our enrollment problems are not going away, and we compete with both coed and single-sex schools. Of the top 10 colleges to which our applicants also apply, seven are coed. Virtually all who transfer from R-MWC do so to a coed school. These market factors affect our financial realities.

The decision to go co-ed was not welcomed by everyone. Alumnae and students organized protests which were covered by local and national media. Many students accused the school of having recruited them under false pretenses, as the administration did not warn new or current students that they were considering admitting men. Lawsuits were filed against the school by both students and alumnae.

It was renamed Randolph College on July 1, 2007, when it became coeducational. The ensuing period of integration was, perhaps unsurprisingly, difficult. The first full-time male students saw their mailboxes and doors vandalized, and were quickly polarized. The last class to have the option to receive diplomas from Randolph-Macon Woman's College graduated on May 16, 2010.

Randolph College is named after John Randolph of Roanoke, Virginia. Randolph (1773-1833) was an eccentric planter and politician who, in his will, released hundreds of slaves after his death and once fought a duel with Henry Clay.

Presidents
 Sue Ott Rowlands, 2022–present
 Bradley Bateman, 2013–2022
 John E. Klein, 2007–2013
 Ginger H. Worden '69 (Interim President), 2006–2007
 Kathleen Gill Bowman, 1994–2006
 Lambuth M. Clarke, 1993–1994
 Linda Koch Lorimer, 1987–1993
 Robert A. Spivey, 1978–1987
 William F. Quillian, Jr., 1952–1978
 Theodore H. Jack, 1933–1952
 N. A. Pattillo, 1931–1933
 Dice Robins Anderson, 1920–1931
 William A. Webb, 1913–1919
 William Waugh Smith, 1891–1912

Academics 
Randolph College is primarily an undergraduate institution, offering a Bachelor of Arts, Bachelor of Science, and a Bachelor of Fine Arts across the humanities, social sciences, and natural sciences. The College also offers several Master's programs: a Master of Arts in Teaching, A Master of Fine Arts in Creative Writing, and a Master of Coaching and Sport Leadership.

In the fall of 2021, Randolph launched a new curriculum model called TAKE2. This model breaks each semester up into seven-week "sessions," during which students take two courses at a time. This is a break from the traditional curricular model where students take four or five courses through an entire semester.

Maier Museum of Art

Randolph College's Maier Museum of Art features works by outstanding American artists of the 19th and 20th centuries. The college has been collecting American art since 1920 and the Maier now houses a collection of several thousand paintings, prints, drawings, and photographs in the college's permanent collection.

The Maier hosts an active schedule of special exhibitions and education programs throughout the year. Through its programs, internships, museum studies practicums, and class visits, the Maier Museum of Art provides valuable learning opportunities for Randolph students and the community at large.

In 2007, there was some controversy when Randolph College announced that it would sell four paintings from its collection.

Traditions

The rivalry between 'odd' and 'even' graduating classes is the lynchpin of many traditions at Randolph College. The groups are distinguished based on whether their graduation year is an odd or even number, hence the names. As students spend four years earning their undergraduate degrees at Randolph, there are always two odd 'sister-classes' and two even 'sister-classes'. These groups participate in certain celebratory events together depending on the year.

Special programs

Randolph College Abroad: The World in Britain
Since 1968, the college has hosted a study abroad program at the University of Reading, England. Each year as many as 35 students are selected for the program. Commonly taken during the junior year, students may choose to enroll for the full academic year or for the fall or spring semester only. Students live in one of three Randolph-owned houses across the street from the University of Reading campus, and travel as a class to various cities and destinations in England.

In 2018, the Randolph College Board of Trustees made the decision to end The World in Britain program after the ensuing academic year. This decision is believed to relate to a recent uptick in tuition costs from the University of Reading, itself, making the program financially unviable. Many students and alums of the program were saddened by this news, as they considered it to be a critical component of their educational experience.

The American Culture program
A minor in American Culture offers Randolph College students the opportunity to study American society and culture by drawing upon resources, techniques, and approaches from a variety of disciplines. The American Culture program also accepts visiting students from other American colleges and universities for a one-semester intensive study of a particular theme or region, including literature, art, history, and travel components.

Notable people

Faculty
 Gary Dop, poet
 Celestia Susannah Parrish (1853–1918), notable psychologist and educator
 Louise Jordan Smith (1869-1928), painter
 Rudy Rucker (1980-1982), mathematician, computer scientist, science fiction author and one of the founders of the cyberpunk literary movement
 Susan Kellermann, actress
 Audrey Shuey (1910-1977), Psychology Department chair and exponent of scientific racism

Alumnae

References

External links

Official athletics website

 
Former women's universities and colleges in the United States
Education in Lynchburg, Virginia
Private universities and colleges in Virginia
Educational institutions established in 1891
Universities and colleges accredited by the Southern Association of Colleges and Schools
Tourist attractions in Lynchburg, Virginia
1891 establishments in Virginia
Buildings and structures in Lynchburg, Virginia
Non-profit organizations based in Lynchburg, Virginia
Old Dominion Athletic Conference schools